Boven Digoel Regency is a regency (kabupaten) in the northern part of the Indonesian province of South Papua. It is split off from Merauke Regency (of which it used to be a part) on 12 November 2002. The administrative centre is the town of Tanahmerah.

Administrative districts
The regency comprises twenty districts (distrik), tabulated below with their areas and their populations at the 2010 Census and the 2020 Census. The table also includes the location of the district administrative centres and the number of administrative villages (rural desa and urban kelurahan) in each district.

History

In the Dutch East Indies era, the present Boven Digoel Regency was known as Digul Atas (Upper Digul), located on the banks of the Digul River.

Boven-Digoel was a Dutch prison camp in the Dutch East Indies at the headwaters of the Digul River, where Indonesian nationalists and communists were interned between 1928 and 1942. Initially set to accommodate prisoners of the 1926 revolt led by the Communist Party of Indonesia, Boven-Digoel later was used as an exile for the national movement figures with a recorded number of prisoners of 1,308 people. Among the figures who had been exiled there were Mohammad Hatta, Sutan Syahrir, Sayuti Melik, and Marco Kartodikromo.

When the Pacific War broke out and Japan occupied Indonesia, Boven-Digoel prisoners were evacuated by the Dutch to Australia. The transfer was based on concerns that the prisoners would rebel if they remained at Boven-Digoel. It was hoped that the Indonesians brought to Australia would help the Dutch. It turned out that these political prisoners influenced the Australian trade union to boycott the Dutch ships that landed in the country. After the Allies succeeded in winning, the prisoners were returned to their original places in Indonesia.

The camp was reused to imprison Indonesian nationalist from Papua during West New Guinea dispute such as J.A. Dimara, Petrus Korwa and Hanoch Rumbrar.

References

External links

Statistics publications from Statistics Indonesia (BPS)
 

Regencies of South Papua